The Critics' Choice Movie Award for Best Sci-Fi/Horror Movie is one of the awards given to people working in the motion picture industry by the Broadcast Film Critics Association at their annual Critics' Choice Movie Awards. It was first given out in 2012 and retired in 2019.

List of winners and nominees

2010s

References

F
Lists of films by award
Awards for best film
Mass media science fiction awards